"Everyday Is Christmas" is a Christmas song by Jacky Cheung (Cantonese pinyin: Hok Yau)（中文名：张学友）, written by Roxanne Seeman and Philipp Steinke. It was issued as a single from Cheung's Private Corner album released on January 29, 2010, by Universal Music. The song was ranked by Nokia's Ovi.com download service as the tenth most downloaded Christmas song in 2010.

"Everyday Is Christmas" was recorded by Earth, Wind & Fire on their Holiday album, released October 21, 2014 by Legacy Recordings, Sony Music.

Recording 
Pre-production took place in Hong Kong with Andrew Tuason (杜自持) producing and coordinating with international songwriters. The rhythm section was recorded in Malaysia.  Cheung's vocals were recorded in Hong Kong.  The song was mixed by Gerry Brown  in Los Angeles.

Lyrics and composition 
Roxanne Seeman and Philipp Steinke composed "Everyday Is Christmas" on guitar in Santa Monica.  The demo was recorded with Philipp Steinke singing and playing keyboards at Seeman's studio and USC musicians overdubbing string bass, drums, and horns.

Everyday is Christmas was the first of seven songs written by Seeman for Cheung's "Private Corner" canto-jazz album project. Cheung tried having the lyrics for "Everyday Is Christmas" adapted into Cantonese, but liked the meaning of the lyrics in English so much that he decided to record it in English.  It is the only song on the "Private Corner" album that Cheung sings in English.

Critical reception 
Nokia's music download service website Ovi.com announced that "Everyday is Christmas" was the tenth most downloaded Christmas song in 2010, joining classic hits such as Wham's "Last Christmas" and Mariah Carey's "All I Want for Christmas is You". Cheung is the only Chinese language singer to make it into the Top Ten.

Live performance 

Cheung performed "Everyday Is Christmas" at his Private Corner Mini-Concert at the Hong Kong Jockey Club on April 30, 2010. The "Private Corner" Mini-Concert DVD was released on July 23, 2010.

Credits and personnel 
Credits are adapted from the album's liner notes.

 Andy Peterson - bass
 Andrew Tuason (杜自持) - producer, arranger, piano
 Lewis Pragasam - drums
 Steve Thornton - percussion
 Charles Huntley - tenor saxophone
 Miguel Inot - alto saxophone
 Ben Pelletier - trombone
 John Campo - trumpet
 Paul Panichi - trumpet
 Michael Stever - horn arrangement
 Gerry "The Gov" Brown - mixing engineer
 Bernie Grundman – mastering
 Jamie Wilson – guitar

Earth, Wind & Fire version

Earth, Wind & Fire released "Everyday Is Christmas" as part of their Holiday album in 2014. The song was produced by Philip Bailey and Myron McKinley. The Holiday album is a perennial release by Sony Music in their Classic Christmas Album series.

Personnel 

 Philip Bailey, executive producer, producer, vocals               
 Myron McKinley, keyboards, piano, producer, synthesizer         
 Jerry Hey, horn arrangements
 Dave Pensado, mixing
 Tommy Vicari, engineer, horn section

Nils Landgren version

Nils Landgren, Swedish R&B funk and jazz trombone player, also known as The Man With The Red Horn or Mr. Redhorn, released "Everyday Is Christmas" as part of his "Christmas With My Friends V"  album on October 28, 2016. Following the release, Nils Landgren toured Germany for a month. The "Christmas With My Friends" collection achieved gold status during this time, selling 125,000 albums.

Personnel 
Credits are adapted from the album's liner notes.

 Nils Landgren - trombone, vocals 
 Sharon Dyall - vocals
 Jeanette Köhn - vocals
 Jessica Pilnäs - vocals
 Ida Sand - vocals, piano, school organ
 Eva Kruse - bass
 Jonas Knutsson - saxophones 
 Johan Norberg - guitars, kantele
 Lasse Nilsson - recording engineer
 Janne Hansson - assistant recording engineer
Recorded at Atlantis studio, Stockholm
Additional recording - Johan Norberg at Krubaston studio
Mixed and  mastered by Lasse Nilsson at Nilento studios, Kållered

References

External links 

 

2010 songs
Jacky Cheung songs
Songs written by Roxanne Seeman
Songs written by Philipp Steinke
Christmas songs
Earth, Wind & Fire songs
2014 songs
2016 songs